Stephen Falk (born April 25, 1972) is an American screenwriter and producer best known as the creator, executive producer, and showrunner of the FXX series You're the Worst.
Falk served as co-executive producer of Netflix’s Orange Is the New Black, and Showtime’s Weeds as well.

In 2012, Falk received a Writers Guild of America award nomination for episodic comedy for an episode of Weeds called "Object Impermanence", and a second in 2014 for his work on Orange is the New Black. 
Falk does a weekly webshow about movies with his group The Film Pigs, and has a long-running live storytelling show at The Virgil in Los Angeles called Public School.

, Falk has been developing the fantasy novel Spoonbenders to pilot for Showtime.

References

External links

Murthi, Vikram (Sep 18, 2014) "You’re The Worst creator Stephen Falk on a sideways approach to romantic comedies", A.V. Club.   
Marechal, AJ (July 17, 2013) "FX Orders Stephen Falk's 'You're the Worst' to Pilot", Variety.
Lesley, Goldberg (July 17, 2013) "FX Orders Comedy Pilot from 'Weeds' EP", The Hollywood Reporter.
Black, Peter (September 19, 2014) "'You're The Worst' Creator: 'I'm Just Trying To Create A Show About Realistic Human Behavior'", Design & Trend.
Wright, Megh (December 4, 2014) "2015 WGA Award Nominees Include 'High Maintenance,' 'Inside Amy Schumer,' and 'Louie'", Split Sider.
Pond, Steve (February 14, 2015) "Writers Guild Awards: 'Grand Budapest Hotel,' 'Imitation Game' Win Screenplay Awards (Complete List of Winners)", The Wrap.
Ryan, Maureen (September 19, 2014) "'You're The Worst' Finale Scoop and Much More From Creator Stephen Falk", The Huffington Post.
 Hooptie (FX Productions) "I wanted to honor my hometown of Berkeley, Calif."

1972 births
Living people
American television producers
American television writers
American screenwriters